Man Walking Around a Corner was an early film, shot by Louis Le Prince. According to David Wilkinson's 2015 documentary The First Film it is not film, but a series of photographs, 16 in all, each taken from one of the lens from Le Prince's camera. Le Prince went on to develop the one-lens camera and on the 14th October 1888 he finally made the world's first moving image.

Production
The film lasts less than one second, taken on a 16-lens camera.

See also
 1887 in film
 Brighton School (filmmaking)

References

External links

1887 films
1880s short films
1887 directorial debut films
Louis Le Prince films